Catherine of Bosnia was a 15th-century Bosnian queen consort.

Catherine of Bosnia  may also refer to:

 Catherine (1336–1385), daughter of Stephen II, Ban of Bosnia
 Catherine of Bosnia, Countess of Cilli, 14th-century Bosnian princess
 Catherine of Bosnia (princess), her daughter 
 Catherine of Bosnia, Grand Princess of Hum (1294–1355)
 Catherine of Bosnia, Baness of Slavonia (died after 1310)